Georg Mathias "Matti" Schreck (19 December 1897 – 19 October 1946) was a Finnish banker and film producer. He produced a total of 50 films between 1935–1945.

Selected filmography 

Jääkärin morsian (1938)
Rikas tyttö (1939)
Jumalan myrsky (1940)
Kirkastettu sydän (1943)
Linnaisten vihreä kamari (1945)

References

External links 
 

1897 births
1946 deaths
People from Tampere
People from Häme Province (Grand Duchy of Finland)
Finnish film producers